Novellana is one of nine parishes (administrative divisions) in the Cudillero municipality, within the province and autonomous community of Asturias, in northern Spain. 

The population was 317 in 2007.

Villages
 Castañeras
 Nuviana

References

Parishes in Cudillero